A novated lease is a motor vehicle lease which has been novated, that is, the obligations in the contract have been transferred from one party to another.

A lease is novated with a three way agreement (Deed of novation) between  the lessee,  the lessor (usually a finance company), and a third party, under which all parties agree that the third party will take on some or all of the lessee's obligations under the lease (generally this is making the rental payments instead of the lessee).

Novated leases in Australia

Novated leases are almost exclusively used in Australia as part of an arrangement for providing the use of a motor vehicle by an employer to an employee via salary packaging.

In a salary packaging arrangement involving a novated lease, an employee leases a motor vehicle and the lease is novated to their employer, that is, the employer agrees to take on the obligations of making the lease payments and the right to use the vehicle.  The employer then provides the use of the vehicle to the employee as a fringe benefit.  The employer will also usually pay the other running costs of the vehicle such as fuel, insurance, registration, service and maintenance as part of the arrangement.  The employer reduces the salary of the employee by their total cost.  This reduction in the employee's salary results in less income tax being payable by the employee, hopefully resulting in a net financial benefit to the employee.

The term "novated lease" is sometimes used to refer the whole salary packaging arrangement.  This can lead to confusion as the lease is only a component of the arrangement, and the arrangement is not itself a lease. Similarly the terms "Novated lease company", "Lease company", and "Leasing company", are sometimes used to refer to a salary packaging management company who manages a salary packaging arrangement rather than the finance company who is actually the lessor.

If the employee ceases to be employed by that employer, the novation is cancelled, and all obligations and rights assumed by the employer under the novation agreement revert to the employee.  The lease can subsequently be novated to a new employer.   Once the term of the lease has expired, all obligations and rights under the deed of novation cease.

Salary packaging and novated leases

In salary packaging an employer enters an arrangement to provide non-cash benefits to their employees in exchange for an equivalent reduction in salary, in order to reduce income taxes paid by the employee on that salary, while still providing the same net benefit.  A novated lease is a way of providing the benefit of the use of a motor vehicle for an employee via salary packaging without the employer having to actually own the vehicle and also allowing the vehicle to move from employer to employer with the employee bearing the responsibility of the transaction.

Tax treatment of a novated lease

In Australia, non cash benefits provided to an employee are regarded as fringe benefits and employers must pay fringe benefits tax (FBT) on the value of these benefits at a rate equivalent to the highest marginal income tax rate.   Since after novation of the lease the employer is now paying the running costs of the vehicle and providing the use of the vehicle to the employee, it is a fringe benefit.

Cars are treated in a concessional manner by the fringe benefits legislation and rather than using the actual running costs, the value of the fringe benefit can be set at 20% of the original purchase price of the vehicle, less stamp duty, motor vehicle registration and Compulsory Third Party Insurance.  This concessional treatment assumes some business use of the provided motor vehicle, but business use is not actually required.  Other vehicles such as commercial vehicles, utilities and motorbikes are not subject to this treatment, but may be exempt from FBT under certain circumstances.  In 2022, amendments to the Fringe Benefits Tax Assessment Act 1986 were made to exempt employers from FBT if they provide an eligible Electric vehicle or Plug in Hybrid Electric Vehicle to their employees. 

The fringe benefit value may be reduced to two thirds of the original value at the start of the FBT year (1 April) following 4 full years since the purchase of the vehicle by the lessor. As most novated leases are for 5 years or less, this has a limited effect.

In addition, if the employer is registered for goods and services tax (GST) they can claim an input tax credit equal to the amount of GST they have paid as part of the running cost.  This reduces their net cost, and in the case of a salary packaging arrangement, the corresponding reduction in employee salary.

Generally an employer also would expect their employee to reimburse the FBT the employer must pay, so the reduction in employee salary becomes equal to the total running costs paid by the employer, less GST, plus any FBT costs and administration costs.

Employee contribution method (ECM)

The method of valuing the fringe benefit for a car or other motor vehicle allows a contribution from the employee toward the running costs to offset the fringe benefit.  Since the employee is now directly paying for some of the costs, this reduces the income tax and GST benefits, but because FBT, equivalent to the highest marginal tax rate, is eliminated, the net cost to the employee of the arrangement is reduced.   This only works if the concessional method for valuation of the fringe benefit (at 20% of the purchase price) is lower than the actual running cost.   The employee contribution can take either the form of direct payment to suppliers or can be paid to the employer.  Since the maximum benefit is obtained by making a contribution of exactly the amount of the fringe benefit (eliminating all FBT), usually the latter is used to ensure the exact amount of the fringe benefit is contributed.  In this case, the employer must remit GST on the employee contribution to the ATO. Thus the reduction in employee salary becomes equal to the total running costs paid by the employer, less GST on those costs, less the employee contribution, plus GST on the employee contribution.

The employee contribution method increases the amount of income tax and GST paid by the employee because less of the cost is paid by the employer, resulting in less salary reduction and fewer input tax credits.  This increase in tax is almost always smaller than the amount of FBT being eliminated, even considering the tax saved by the additional reduction in salary due to the FBT, and so the net cost to the employee is reduced when the ECM is used.

The use of the employee contribution method can lead to additional confusion about the costs to the employee, as in practice, the reduction in salary and the employee contribution both appear on the employee's payslip as deductions. The salary reduction is often listed as "pre-tax" and the ECM as "post-tax".  In fact, the reduction in salary ("pre-tax") is never paid to the employee as this would result in it being income which would then be taxable.   The ECM amount is paid to the employee, but then immediately returned to the employer.

GST on the purchase price of a vehicle

In salary packaging advertising material, a benefit frequently claimed is that the employee does not pay the GST component of the purchase price of the vehicle.  This is technically correct, since it is the finance company (lessor) actually purchases the vehicle and pays the GST, not the employee.  However, the statement is misleading, implying that the net cost to the employee is reduced by the amount of GST on the purchase price if they buy a car via a salary packaged novated lease.  In actual fact the way that GST works is that in every transaction GST credits can be claimed by the business supplying the good or service and GST is added onto the cost paid by the purchaser.

GST must be included in lease rentals  and also in the residual by the lessor, which has the effect of increasing the total amount of GST to be paid, especially when GST exempt items such as stamp duty are bundled into the lease contract.  GST is also included in the residual which may be paid by the employee if they fail to return the car at the end of the lease.  GST on the rental payments can be claimed by the employer as an input tax credit, but if the ECM is used to offset the fringe benefit, then the GST owing on the ECM payments offsets this input tax credit.  Since claiming the GST on running costs other than lease rentals, such as fuel, is also claimed as a benefit of salary packaging a novated lease, in reality the employee salary packaging a novated lease with ECM and keeping the car at the end will end up paying more GST on the purchase of the vehicle that if they had bought it directly.  If the ECM is not used, all the GST except that on the residual could be claimed by the employer, but the additional cost of paying FBT is always greater or equal to any possible GST benefit.  In the situation of salary packaging of FBT exempt vehicles, all GST paid by the employer can be claimed as a credit and reduces the net cost to the employee of the arrangement.

Residual values and the end of a lease

At the end of the lease, the lessee is required by the contract to return the vehicle to the lessor. There will often be a term in the lease contract that requires a lessee who returns a vehicles at the end of the lease to make good any shortfall between the residual and the market value of the vehicle, if the market value is below the residual.  The residual value is a nominal depreciated value of the vehicle as defined by the contract, and because it is determined at the start of the lease, it will not be the actual market value of the vehicle at the end of the lease.  In general, lessors are in the business of finance and not of selling used cars, and so do not actually wish to take possession of the car and go to all the effort of converting it into cash. There cannot be an obligation or even the right for the lessee to purchase the vehicle as part of the contract, as the result would not be a bona fide lease, but instead a hire purchase or similar arrangement.

To enable/encourage lessees to keep the car rather than returning it, lease contracts have terms which allow the lessee to pay a penalty for failing to return the vehicle in the amount of the residual value.  This legal fiction, that the lessee refuses to return the vehicle as required by the contract, is in effect, a means whereby the lessee can purchase the vehicle from the lessor at the residual value at the end of the lease.

Since the residual includes GST and is not paid by the employer (so there is no tax saving for this cost), it is beneficial to the employee have the lowest possible residual value and to pay correspondingly higher rental during the lease.  For this reason, the minimum value of residuals are restricted by the Australian Taxation Office although .  In general this means that the market value of the vehicle exceeds the residual, resulting in additional benefit to the employee which is not subject to FBT.

Third party salary packaging companies

In Australia, salary packaging arrangements are usually outsourced to third party salary packaging companies to reduce administrative load on the employer.  In those cases, when a motor vehicle is salary packaged with a novated lease, the third party arranges the leasing of the vehicle (usually through another party), the novation, GST and FBT accounting, and budgeting for, and paying of, all running costs in exchange for a management fee, and possibly rebates/commissions from suppliers. The third party arranges for regular payments from the employer (and employee, if ECM is being used and paid directly to the employer) to cover the budgeted running costs (including their fee).  These payments appear in a salary packaging account which shows the budget, payments in, and running costs being paid out.  In addition, the employee may directly pay suppliers for running costs and then be reimbursed from their salary packaging account by the salary packaging company.

Confusing use of the term "novated lease"

While a novated lease does not have to be part of a salary packaging arrangement, it is unlikely to be used outside such an arrangement as there is otherwise no reason for the third party to undertake the obligations.

Motor vehicle salary packaging arrangements are often described as "novated leases" even though the arrangement involves far more than just the lease. This usage of "novated lease" is almost universal on documentation, advertising and the websites of salary packaging companies and leads to confusion about whether it is the whole arrangement or just the lease itself which is meant by the term.  It is speculated that salary packaging companies make the process deliberately confusing so consumers cannot compare with other financing methods. By implying that they are the lessee rather than the actual other party (finance company), they could conceal any commissions being paid for referring leases to finance companies. Employees may not realise they can shop around for the best deal on the lease with different finance companies.  Budgets are quoted without including GST, "tax savings" are shown using unrealistic comparisons and it is claimed that the vehicle is owned by the employee when it is in fact owned by the lessor.  Consumers may be misled by statements like "Peace of mind that all your vehicle costs are packaged into one simple payment." into thinking that the package includes all running costs regardless of actual cost or usage, when it is simply an estimate or budget for running costs.

Often the employee deals only with the third party for the entire process, with no interaction at all with the lessor or the employer.  In addition, the salary reductions still appear on their pay slip as deductions, shown as "pre-tax" deductions and employee contributions are shown as "post-tax" deductions.   It therefore appears to the employee that they are directly paying the running costs of the motor vehicle (albeit in some strange tax beneficial way), even though the employer is paying for all or part of those costs, by definition.  In addition, the leased vehicle is effectively their personal vehicle, chosen by them, available for their exclusive use, and they have the option to "purchase" it at the end of the lease by failing to return it and paying the penalty.

It is frequently considered by employees that a salary packaging arrangement including a novated lease is a loan for the vehicle which includes non-finance running costs. This confusion is compounded by salary packaging companies and finance companies who quote interest rates for leases.

Types of novated lease

This confusion extends to the terms used by salary packaging companies to describe different salary packaging arrangements which include a novated lease.

The first term is "fully maintained novated lease", describing the most common type of salary packaging arrangement, where a finance lease is novated, so the employer agrees to pay the rental payments. In addition, the employer also pays other running costs which are not included in the lease .  This terminology is confusing as outside of salary packaging, a "fully maintained lease", describes an operating lease where the lease contract includes in the rental payments the fixed running costs of a vehicle or asset, such as insurance, registration, servicing and roadside assistance as well as some variable costs like fuel and tyres. The lessor simply hands back the vehicle at the end of the lease with the lessor assuming the residual value risk.  There are usually terms in the contract with penalties or fees to protect the lessor from excessive costs and depreciation of the asset.  Thus, a fully maintained novated lease is not a novation of a fully maintained lease.

It is of course possible to novate a fully maintained lease; this may be called a fully maintained novated operating lease.

To make things more confusing, it is also very common to include up front costs over and above the purchase cost, such as stamp duty, registration, the first year's comprehensive insurance, extended warranties and other insurances and fees, into the lease in a fully maintained novated lease, since there will not have been sufficient time to set up the payments by the employer into the salary packaging account to cover those costs.  For this reason it is also common for novated leases to have deferred payments, that is, the first one or two rentals are set at $0, with the remaining rentals increased to compensate.

The third type of lease is described as a novated finance lease or non-maintained novated lease where only the novated lease itself is salary packaged, with none of the other running costs such as fuel, insurance or maintenance being paid by the employer.  This arrangement is of little or no benefit to the employee as there is no change to the fringe benefit value, being based on the original purchase price, but any tax benefits on the other running costs are lost as they are not salary packaged.  The effect of paying FBT or using ECM offsets most or all the potential tax benefits from salary packaging the lease rentals alone.

Benefits and pitfalls of salary packaged novated leases

For the employee:

 Income tax and GST savings:
While a salary packaged novated lease has the potential to yield tax benefits for the employee, providing net savings on the overall cost of purchasing and running a motor vehicle, the complexity of the process and lack of transparency makes it difficult for most people to evaluate the extent of the benefits.    Salary packaging companies will usually provide a comparison stating projected savings, but this only compares leasing the vehicle with the same estimated costs without the benefit of salary packaging.  This is unlikely to be how a motor vehicle would actually be purchased in Australia, in most cases a car or personal loan or some other source of funds such as savings or redraw from a home mortgage would be used.  Additional costs of leasing and fees can mean the raw running costs of a salary packaged novated lease are significantly higher than the equivalent costs of private ownership with a loan, but with the benefits of tax savings, the net cost can be lower.  In addition, tax deductions for any business use of a vehicle are specifically disallowed for a salary packaged novated lease.

 Access to volume discounts if the employer/salary packaging company has many vehicles under this scheme:
Salary packaging companies often claim access to fleet discounts on the purchase price of vehicles that are not available to individuals.  In some cases these may be only on specific makes or models of vehicle, and may be no greater or even lower than discounts which can be negotiated by an individual with a dealer.  There is generally no reason why an individual cannot negotiate an acceptable purchase price, then arrange a lease which is then novated and the vehicle salary packaged.  Significant savings can be obtained by salary packaging a novated lease on a cheaper used or demonstrator vehicle.  Additional volume discounts may also be available on insurance or servicing arranged by the salary packaging company, but contrariwise, they may be more expensive than those privately arranged.

 Perceived benefits that are greater than actual benefits:
Advertising by salary packaging providers emphasising the tax benefits of a salary packaged novated lease, the out of sight nature of salary reduction/deduction and a lack of understanding of how salary packaging actually works may induce employees to lease vehicles with costs far in excess of what they would ordinarily spend, or to continually revolve leases with the mistaken impression that the cost is equivalent or lower than keeping their existing car.

 Convenience of third party management: 
There is a perceived benefit in not having to budget or worry about paying for running costs, especially large once per year costs. However budget shortfalls are common complaints in salary packaging, and much of the paperwork load is the same in salary packaging, or even greater if reimbursement requests are required.

 Flexibility in the choice of a car compared to a company car arrangement
 Vehicle stays with the employee and can be transferred to a new employer:
However the counter to this is if the employee wants or needs to sell the vehicle during the term of the lease, breaking the lease contract can be very expensive, sometimes far in excess of the current market value of the vehicle.

For the employer:
 A way to provide an effective increase in employees' salaries with no or minimal cost to the business
 A cost effective alternative to operating a fleet of company vehicles
 Compared to company cars, the business does not assume any risk for the vehicles
 Compared to company cars, employee vehicles are "off balance sheet"
 Compared to company cars, the employer is not stuck with the vehicle if the employee leaves.

For the service providers:
 They provide various services for fees and/or commission.

Novated leases in the United Kingdom

In the UK, a novated lease refers to a car lease which has been novated (transferred) to a third party with the consent of the lessor, the original lessee and the prospective lessee. The transfer of liability for the lease, between two legal entities, is normally covered by tripartite contract.

Swapping car leases is a relatively new phenomenon in the UK (and a number of online services are starting to appear), although the market for novating leases is well established in the United States.

See also
Fringe benefits
Fringe benefits tax (Australia)
Finance lease
Operating lease
Salary packaging

References

External links
Novated leases questions and answers from the Australian Taxation Office
Deed of Novation from Queensland Government GITC.

Leasing
Employee benefits
Taxation in Australia
Contract law
United Kingdom business law
Employment in Australia
Australian business law